Wang Qun (Pinyin: Wáng Qún; born 17 November 1991) is a Chinese swimmer who specialised in the breaststroke.

Career

Wang attended the Qingdao Military Sports School where she was coached by Shi Lili. She never joined the provincial team but jumped directly onto the national team in 2005 after she broke the School Games record in both the 100m and 200m breaststroke.

At the 2005 East Asian Games in Macao, she defeated star teammate Luo Xuejuan in the 100m event. At the world short course championships in 2006, she qualified to the breaststroke final and placed seventh. She was a double medalist at the Asian Games, winning the bronze in the 50 m breaststroke in the 2006 Asian Games in Doha and the silver medal  in the 200m individual medley at the 2010 Asian Games in Guangzhou.

She won four medals at the 2006 FINA Youth World Swimming Championships, including two golds in the breaststroke.

Wang was a member of the Chinese team at the 2008 Olympic Games in Beijing but did not compete. She was noticed by the media after photos of her training showed marks from cupping therapy.

Major achievements
2003 Shandong Provincial Championships - 1st 100 m breast
2006 World Cup in Berlin - 2nd 200 m breast
2006 World Cup in Stockholm - 6th 200 m breast
2006 National Championships - 2nd 200 m breast
2005 East Asian Games - 1st 100 m & 200 m breast
2007 National Championships - 1st 200 m breast
2006 Asian Games - 3rd 50 m breast
2010 Asian Games - 2nd 200 m individual medley
2010 National Championships - 3rd 200 m breast

References

1991 births
Living people
Chinese female medley swimmers
Olympic swimmers of China
Swimmers from Qingdao
Asian Games medalists in swimming
Swimmers at the 2006 Asian Games
Swimmers at the 2010 Asian Games
Asian Games silver medalists for China
Asian Games bronze medalists for China
Medalists at the 2006 Asian Games
Medalists at the 2010 Asian Games
Chinese female breaststroke swimmers
21st-century Chinese women